Antoni Piasecki (born 12 December 1913, date of death unknown) was a Polish footballer. He played in one match for the Poland national football team in 1935.

References

External links
 

1913 births
Year of death missing
Polish footballers
Poland international footballers
Place of birth missing
Association footballers not categorized by position